Bolno is a village in the Resen Municipality of North Macedonia, near the mountain of Galičica. It is also home to a football club, FK Ilinden.

History
Bolno is located near the Iron Age site of Selishte, which excavations of the 2010s characterized as an Illyrian fort in the Prespa-Ohrid lakeland region.

In the early 20th century, the village had population of 640 Bulgarian Exarchists. There was also Bulgarian school in Bolno (Bouno).

During the Ilinden–Preobrazhenie Uprising of 1903, Bolno was looted and its 96 houses were burnt down.

Demographics 
Bolno has historically been inhabited by Orthodox Bulgarians. According to the censuses after 1948 the local population is consisted of ethnic Macedonians.

People from Bolno 
Dimitar Bogoevski (1918 - 1942), communist revolutionary and poet
Evtim Bogoev (? - 1908), revolutionary, IMARO activist.

References 

Villages in Resen Municipality